Dioxygenyl hexafluoroplatinate is a compound with formula O2PtF6. It is a hexafluoroplatinate of the unusual dioxygenyl cation, O2+, and is the first known compound containing this cation. It can be produced by the reaction of dioxygen with platinum hexafluoride. The fact that  is strong enough to oxidise , whose first ionization potential is 12.2 eV, led Neil Bartlett to correctly surmise that it might be able to oxidise xenon (first ionization potential 12.13 eV). This led to the discovery of xenon hexafluoroplatinate, which proved that the noble gases, previously thought to be inert, are able to form chemical compounds.

Preparation

Dioxygenyl hexafluoroplatinate can be synthesized from the elements by the action of a mixture of oxygen and fluorine gas on platinum sponge at 450 °C.  It can also be prepared by the reaction of oxygen difluoride with platinum sponge. At 350 °C, platinum tetrafluoride is produced; above 400 °C, dioxygenyl hexafluoroplatinate is formed.

T = 350 °C:     2    +   Pt   →      +   

T > 400 °C:     6    +   2 Pt   →   2    +   

O2   +   PtF6   →   O2PtF6

Structure

Dioxygenyl hexafluoroplatinate(V) has a rhombohedral crystal structure at low temperatures, and a cubic structure at high temperatures, isomorphous to potassium hexafluoroplatinate(V), . Its ionic lattice is indicated by its insolubility in carbon tetrafluoride. In its cubic form, the  octahedra are slightly compressed along the three-fold rotational axis, along which the long axis of the  cations also lies. Each  cation is surrounded by 12 fluorine atoms, 6 of which surround it in a puckered six-membered ring, and of the remaining 3 each belong to the two  octahedra lying along the long axis of the cation.

Reactions

Dioxygenyl hexafluoroplatinate(V) is a convenient route to prepare other platinum(V) compounds, such as potassium hexafluoroplatinate(V) via reaction with potassium fluoride in iodine pentafluoride solution in which iodine heptafluoride is produced:

2    +   2 KF   +      →   2    +   2     +

References

Fluoro complexes
Oxygen compounds
Platinum compounds
Fluorometallates